Yutan Subdistrict is a subdistrict in Ningxiang City, Hunan Province, China. It borders Baimaqiao Subdistrict to the southwest, Chengjiao Subdistrict to the north and Lijingpu Subdistrict to the southeast.

Administrative division
The Subdistrict is divided into nine communities: Bayi Community, Chuwei Community, Huaming Community, Nanyuan Community, Tongyi Community,  Wenzhong Community,  Xiangshan Community, Xincheng Community, and Xue'an Community.

Geography 
Wei River, also known as "Mother River", is a tributary of the Xiang River that flows through the city.

Education 
Three senior high schools are located within the city: Ningxiang No. 1 High School, Ningxiang Experimental Senior High School, and Yutan Experimental Senior High School.

Culture 

Huaguxi is a popular form of theater.

Transport 
China National Highway 319 runs through the subdistrict, as do the G5513 Changsha–Zhangjiajie Expressway and 3 county rural roads: the 319 National Highway which continues into Yiyang City, linking Yutan with the Chengjiao Subdistrict and Jinghuapu Township; the Hunan Provincial Highway 1810 from Yutan which runs through Shuangfupu Town, Hengshi Town, Laoliangcang Town, Liushahe Town, Qingshanqiao Town and connects to Loudi City; and the Hunan Provincial Highway 1823 from Yutan which runs through Donghutang Town, Huaminglou Town and connects to Shaoshan City.

The Luoyang–Zhanjiang Railway, from Luoyang City, Henan Province, to Zhanjiang, Guangdong, runs through the city.

Celebrities 

 Huang Yali, singer.

References 

Subdistricts of Ningxiang